Ben Mingay is an Australian actor and singer, perhaps best known for having played Buzz Graham in the series  Packed to the Rafters and Rob Duffy in Wonderland. He played the role of Billy in the stage version of Dirty Dancing in Australia, the United Kingdom and the United States. Mingay together with Michael Falzon, Luke Kennedy, and Matt Lee appeared in the Adelaide Cabaret Festival 2014. In 2015, Mingay joined the cast of soap opera Home and Away in the recurring role of Trystan Powell.

Background 
Mingay studied Opera Voice at the Sydney Conservatorium of Music. 
He plays both piano and acoustic guitar. He is also a fire breather and a stunt driver. He recently divorced his wife Kirby Burgess.

Career 
In 2004 he appeared as a guest on the police series Blue Heelers where he played Troy Baxter. That same year he starred as Jim Beatson on the medical series All Saints.

In 2013, Mingay scored his first major role on television when he joined the main cast of the sixth season of Australian series Packed to the Rafters. He played the young electrician Fergus "Buzz" Graham, father of Jackson Graham (Narek Arman) and employee of Dave Rafter (Erik Thomson). Mingay's Graham enters into a relationship with Emma Mackey (Zoe Cramond) until the series finale on 2 July of that year. That same year, Mingay joined the main cast of Wonderland in the role of Rob Duffy.

Mingay performed in the new cabaret act Swing on This at the Adelaide Cabaret Festival on 7 June 2014 with a cast that included Luke Kennedy, Michael Falzon, and Matt Lee. Festival Artistic Director, and singer in her own right, Kate Ceberano appeared as a special guest. Following Adelaide Cabaret Festival, they performed as the headline act at both the official black tie launch of the refurbished Bunbury Regional Entertainment Centre on 25 July and at the community concert the next evening, again playing to a full house.

Mingay joined the cast of Home and Away as Trystan Powell in 2015.

Mingay has performed at several concerts including the charity benefit Pants Off for Beyond Blue, a concert involving several performers each singing in their underwear.

Training 

 2002 – Agent Showcase with REACTOR acting services at Fox Studios
 2001–2003 – Sydney Conservatorium Vocal Coach – Maree Ryan
 2000–2003 – Classical Training at Sydney Conservatorium of Music
 1999–2001 – Newcastle Conservatorium – Christopher Allan
 1999–2000 – Awarded the 'Florence Austral' Scholarship for Voice from The Newcastle Conservatorium of Music
 1998 – NIDA Workshop- Stage, Acting & Improvisation Skills
 1997 – Higher School Certificate (Shore School) – Ranked top 10% of State in Music

Theatre

Filmography 
Television

 Film

Awards and nominations

ARIA Music Awards
The ARIA Music Awards is an annual awards ceremony that recognises excellence, innovation, and achievement across all genres of Australian music. They commenced in 1987. 

! 
|-
| 2005
| Dirty Dancing - The Classic Story on Stage (with Deone Zanotto)
| Best Original Cast or Show Album
| 
| 
|-

References

External links 
 
Talent House Resume Ben Mingay – Archived

Living people
21st-century Australian male actors
Australian male musical theatre actors
20th-century Australian male actors
Australian male singers
Male actors from Sydney
Singers from Sydney
1979 births
Swing on This members